Jefre Cantu-Ledesma is a multi-instrumentalist, member of several bands, and co-founder of the Root Strata record label based out of San Francisco, California. Cantu-Ledesma got his start in the band Tarentel. He was one of the founding members and is still a primary figure in the band's line-up. Cantu-Ledesma continues to be involved with many musical projects.

His label, Root Strata, has an extensive catalog that includes artists such as Tarentel, Grouper, Yellow Swans, Charalambides, Keith Fullerton Whitman, Oneohtrix Point Never, Barn Owl, Starving Weirdos, Gregg Kowalsky, and more.

Cantu-Ledesma currently lives in Germany.

Discography (by project)

Tarentel
Tarentel CDEP (Temporary Residence Limited)
Travels in Constants vol. 3 CDEP (Temporary Residence Limited) ltd. to 1000 copies (OOP) Part of the Travels in Constants CD Subscription Series
When We Almost Killed Ourselves 8" EP (Temporary Residence Limited) ltd. to 200 copies (OOP)
From Bone to Satellite CD/2×LP (Temporary Residence Limited) vinyl ltd. to 1000 copies (OOP)
Looking for Things, Searching for Things 12-inch EP (Resonant) ltd. to 500 copies (OOP)
Two Sides of Myself 7-inch (Static Caravan Recordings) ltd. to 500 copies (OOP)
split 7-inch w/ Rothko (Jonathon Whiskey) ltd. to 250 copies (OOP)
split 7-inch w/ Lilienthal (Awkward Silence) ltd. to 500 copies (OOP)
The Order of Things CD/2×LP (Neurot Recordings/Static Caravan) vinyl ltd. to 500 copies (OOP)
Fear of Bridges CDEP (Three Lobed Recordings) ltd. to 700 copies (OOP)
Mort aux Vaches CD (Staalplaat) ltd. to 1000 copies (OOP)
Ephemera | Singles 99-00 CD (Temporary Residence Limited)
Latency 12-inch EP (En/Of) ltd. to 100 copies (OOP)
We Move Through Weather CD/2×LP (Temporary Residence Limited)
Paper White CDEP (Temporary Residence Limited)
Big Black Square CDEP (Temporary Residence Limited)
Ghost Weight CDEP (Acuarela Discos)
Paper White / Big Black Square CD (Human Highway)
Home Ruckus 12-inch EP (Root Strata) ltd. to 500 copies (OOP)
Live Edits: Natoma CD (Root Strata) ltd. to 500 copies (OOP)
Ghetto Beats On the Surface of the Sun 4×LP (Music Fellowship) ltd. to 500 copies of each (OOP)
Home Ruckus: Double-Sided Air 7-inch (Type Records) ltd. to 500 copies (OOP)
Home Ruckus: Bottled Smoke CD-R (Digitalis) ltd. to 100 copies (OOP)
Ghetto Beats On the Surface of the Sun 2×CD (Temporary Residence Limited)
Live Edits: Italy & Switzerland CD (Digitalis) ltd. to 500 copies (OOP)
You Can't Hide Your Love Forever Vol. 3: Space Junk 7-inch (Geographic North) ltd. to 300 copies, part of the You Can't Hide Your Love Forever 7-inch Subscription Series (OOP)
Over Water DVD-r collaboration with filmmaker Paul Clipson (Root Strata) "Latest installment of the ongoing collaboration between San Francisco based band Tarentel & filmmaker Paul Clipson. Three shorts of Super8 film and music mostly culled form live performances in Italy & Switzerland in 2005." ltd. to 100 copies (OOP)
Split 7-inch w/ Seaworthy (Sound&Fury) ltd. to 300 copies (100 colored, 200 black), part of the Passeridae 7-inch Subscription Series (2009/2010)
Untitled cassette (Digitalis Limited) (Late 2009/early 2010)

Jefre Cantu-Ledesma
Primary solo project, primarily ambient/drone music

Voice Sutra CD-R (Limited to 100 copies, OOP) (Root Strata) – 2005
Two Suns DVD-r collaboration with Paul Clipson (Limited to 100 copies, OOP) (Root Strata) – 2005
Black is the Color of my True Love's Hair CD-R (Limited to 150 copies, OOP) (Static Caravan) – 2006
Floating Weeds Cassette (Limited to 90 copies, OOP) (Twonicorn) – 2006
Constellations of Spring DVD-r collaboration with Paul Clipson (Limited to 100 copies, OOP) (Root Strata) – 2006
Shining Skull Breath CD-R (Limited to 100 copies, OOP) (Students of Decay) – 2007
The Garden of Forking Paths CD (Spekk) – 2007
The Phantom Harp Mini CD-R (Limited to 100 copies, OOP) (Root Strata) – 2007
Corridors DVD-r collaboration with Paul Clipson (Limited to 100 copies, OOP) (Root Strata) – 2008
The Phantom Harp DVD-r collaboration with Paul Clipson (Limited to 100 copies, OOP) (Root Strata) – 2008
Namu Kie Butsu Cassette (as Jefre Sei Getsu Ledesma) (Limited to 100 copies, OOP) (NNA Tapes) – 2009
Bloodstream Sermon Cassette (Limited to 150 copies, OOP) (Arbor) – 2010
Within Mirrors Collection of previous DVD-r collaborations with Paul Clipson plus two previously unreleased pieces on a DVD with menus designed by C. Spencer Yeh and artwork by Jefre himself (Limited to 500 copies, first 80 in a Bonus Edition with Mini CD-R of previously unreleased Jefre Cantu-Ledesma material) (Students of Decay) – 2010
Love is a Stream LP/CD (Type Records) – 2010
Conversations With Myself CD-r (Self Released) – 2011
Faceless Kiss/Blut Mond 7-inch (Emerald Cocoon) – 2012
Visiting This World LP, art edition (En/Of) – 2012
Speaking Corpse Cassette (Limited to 75 Copies, OOP) (Los Discos Enfantasmes) – 2012
Devotion Digital-Only EP (Shining Skull) – 2013
 Gift of Tongues tape (Limited to 100 copies) (Last Foundation) – 2013
 Music From The Headlands Center For The Arts, Volume One – Another Void CD-R (Limited to 25 copies) and digital-only edition (Shining Skull) – 2013
 Music From The Headlands Center For The Arts, Volume Two – Disappear CD-R (Limited to 25 copies) and digital-only edition (Shining Skull) – 2013
 Music From The Headlands Center For The Arts, Volume Three – Wild River CD-R (Limited to 25 copies) and digital-only edition (Shining Skull) – 2013
 Music From The Headlands Center For The Arts, Volume Four – A World Apart CD-R (Limited to 25 copies) and digital-only edition (Shining Skull) – 2013
 Music From The Headlands Center For The Arts, Volume Five – The Burnt House CD-R (Limited to 25 copies) and digital-only edition (Shining Skull) – 2013
 Music From The Headlands Center For The Arts, Volume Six – Archaic Torso CD-R (Limited to 25 copies) and digital-only edition (Shining Skull) – 2013
 Music From The Headlands Center For The Arts, Volume Seven – Gift Of Tongues CD-R (Limited to 25 copies) and digital-only edition (Shining Skull) – 2013
 Songs of Remembrance tape (Limited to 100 copies) and digital-only edition (Psychic Troubles Tapes) – 2014
 Songs of Forgiveness tape (Limited to 100 copies) and digital-only edition (Baro Records) – 2014
 Eternal Spring Digital-only (self-released) – 2014
 A Year with 13 Moons LP (Limited to 1,200 copies) (Mexican Summer) – 2015
 In Summer tape (Geographic North) – 2016
 On The Echoing Green LP (Mexican Summer) – 2017
 Tracing Back The Radiance LP (Mexican Summer) – 2019
 Poverty – (Boomkat) 2023

Colophon
Ambient solo project
Spring 10-inch (Limited, OOP) (Dreams by Degrees)
Conduction. Convection. Radiation. CD 3-way split w/ The Wind-Up Bird and 1 Mile North (Music Fellowship)
Travels In Constants (Vol. 18): Love Loops CD (Limited, OOP, part of the Travels in Constants CD subscription series (Temporary Residence Limited)

The Holy See
Harsh noise project of Jefre Cantu-Ledesma and Jim Redd
Snowing Ash CD-R (Limited to 200 copies, OOP) (Root Strata)
Blood Honey CD-R (Limited to 100 copies, OOP, part of the Arroyo subscription series) (Digitalis)
Fucking Physics CD-R (Limited to 100 copies, OOP) (Foxglove)

Sea Zombies
Project of Brad Rose (The North Sea, Ajilvsga, Ossining, Digitalis Records) and John Twells (Xela, Type Records) with contributions by Gregg Kowalsky, Jed Bindeman, and Jefre Cantu-Ledesma
It Died in Africa Cassette (Two hand-numbered limited editions: 100/50 copies, OOP) (Digitalis Limited)

The Alps

Kraut/psych rock band
Jewelt Galaxies CD-R (Limited to 200 copies, OOP) (Root Strata)
Spirit Shambles CD-R (Limited to 150 copies, OOP) (Root Strata)
Jewelt Galaxies/Spirit Shambles CD (Spekk)
A Path Through the Sun CD-R (Limited to 100 copies, OOP) (Root Strata)
A Path Through the Moon CD-R (Limited to 100 copies, OOP) (Root Strata)
III CD, LP (Root Strata)
Le Voyage CD, LP (Type)
Easy Action LP (Mexican Summer)

Moholy-Nagy
A heavily synthesizer based and largely improvisational group featuring Jefre Cantu-Ledesma, Danny Paul Grody, and Trevor Montgomery

Like Mirage LP/CD (Temporary Residence Limited) – 2011

Isidore Ducasse
Collaborative project between Jefre Cantu-Ledesma and Trevor Montgomery

Isidore Ducasse LP (limited to 400 copies, OOP) (Blackest Rainbow) – 2011

Josephine
Collaborative project between Jefre Cantu-Ledesma and Tony Cross

You Are Perfect Today Cassette (Digitalis Limited) – 2011

Raum
Collaborative project between Jefre Cantu-Ledesma and Liz Harris (Grouper)

The Event of Your Leaving LP (Glass, House) – 2013
Daughter LP (Yellow Electric) - 2022

Félicia Atkinson and Jefre Cantu-Ledesma
Collaborative project between Félicia Atkinson and Jefre Cantu-Ledesma
Comme Un Seul Narcisse, LP (Shelter Press) - 2016
Limpid as the Solitudes, EP (Shelter Press) - 2018
Un Hiver En Plein Été, LP (Shelter Press) - 2021

References

External links
Tarentel Official site
Root Strata, a record label run by Jefre Cantu-Ledesma & Maxwell August Croy
Last.FM page for Jefre Cantu-Ledesma
Discogs page for Jefre Cantu-Ledesma

Living people
Ambient musicians
Year of birth missing (living people)